Holy Intellect is the debut album by hip-hop group Poor Righteous Teachers, famous for its pro-Five-Percenter messages. The album includes the hip-hop classic "Rock Dis Funky Joint", which sampled "Slippin' into Darkness" by War, a 1970s funk band.

The album is broken down track-by-track by Poor Righteous Teachers in Brian Coleman's book Check the Technique.

In 1998, the album was selected as one of The Sources 100 Best Rap Albums Ever.

Track listing 
All tracks produced by Tony D, except tracks 8 and 10 produced by Eric IQ Gray

Charts

Weekly charts

Year-end charts

Singles

References

External links 

1990 debut albums
Profile Records albums
Poor Righteous Teachers albums